The association football tournament at the 2024 Summer Olympics will be held from 24 July to 10 August 2024 in France.

In addition to the Olympic host city of Paris, matches will also be played in Bordeaux, Décines-Charpieu, Marseille, Nantes, Nice and Saint-Étienne.

Associations affiliated with FIFA may send teams to participate in the tournament. Men's teams are restricted to under-23 players (born on or after 1 January 2001) with a maximum of three overage players allowed, while there are no age restrictions on women's teams.

Brazil are the two-time men's defending champions, while Canada are the women's defending champions.

Competition schedule
The competition schedule was announced on 1 April 2022. The final match schedule was confirmed by FIFA on 28 July 2022.

Venues
A total of seven venues will be used, as confirmed on 17 December 2020.

Qualification
The FIFA Council approved the distribution of spots at their meeting on 24 February 2022.

Men's qualification

In addition to host nation France, 15 men's national under-23 teams will qualify from six separate continental confederations.

Women's qualification

In addition to host nation France, 11 women's national teams will qualify from six separate continental confederations.

References

External links
Paris 2024

 
2024
Summer Olympics
Football
2024
Olympics